Ilidio Salvador Matusse (born August 12, 1975) is a Mozambican former swimmer, who specialized in sprint freestyle events. Matusse competed for Mozambique in the men's 50 m freestyle at the 2000 Summer Olympics in Sydney. He received a ticket from FINA, under a Universality program, in an entry time of 25.51. He challenged seven other swimmers in heat two, including teenagers Khalid Al-Kulaibi of Oman (aged 14) and Sikhounxay Ounkhamphanyavong of Laos (aged 17). He faded down the stretch of the race to take a fourth spot in 26.28, 77-hundredths of a second below his entry standard. Matusse failed to advance into the semifinals, as he placed sixty-fifth overall out of 80 swimmers in the prelims.

References

External links
 

1975 births
Living people
Mozambican male freestyle swimmers
Olympic swimmers of Mozambique
Swimmers at the 2000 Summer Olympics
Sportspeople from Maputo